Prince Frederick Henry Charles of Prussia (30 December 1747 – 26 May 1767) was the second son of Prince Augustus William, the brother of Frederick the Great. His older brother was Frederick William II of Prussia.

Biography
In his early life, the prince received several military promotions and honours; on 16 January 1748 he became a member of the Order of the Black Eagle, and on 20 September 1764 he became captain and company commander of the 1st Battalion Guard of the Gardes du Corps. In September later that year he was raised to commander, and on 26 April 1767 he was made Major General by Frederick II.

At the age of 17, Colonel Hans von Blumenthal, commander of the Gardes du Corps, became the prince's governor. As a result, he and his brother Frederick William spent much time at the Colonel's estate at Paretz.

Prince Henry was a promising young captain in the guards and his uncle the King had high hopes for him. However, in May 1767 he was leading his cuirassier squadron to Berlin for a parade and review when he stopped at the von Kleist estate of Protzen. Here he caught smallpox and died on the 26th, much to his uncle's grief.

Ancestry

References 

1747 births
1767 deaths
Prussian princes
Deaths from smallpox
Infectious disease deaths in Germany
Burials at Berlin Cathedral